= Interstellar Wars =

Interstellar Wars is a 1982 board game published by Attactix.

== Gameplay ==
Interstellar Wars is a strategic game for two players, focusing on conflict between galactic empires.

== Reception ==
Tony Watson reviewed Interstellar Wars in Space Gamer No. 66. Watson commented that "As a first SF game from a new company, Interstellar Wars is adequate, but out outstanding. It certainly avoids the appellation of 'turkey' - but it hits wide of the 'classic' mark as well."
